Miller's pier (Pristan Millera), is a railway station at the quay in Sestroretsk Kurort, Russia. The  pier was constructed from boulders dumped into the Gulf of Finland. In time, the harbour acquired the name "Miller's Harbour".
 
On the bay coast, in 1875, a branch line was laid to the landing stage, and the first structures were erected on it in the same year. In 1899–1900 the Kurort's esplanade was opened, and the line was surrounded with two low enclosures.

References 

Landing stages of Russian coast in Gulf of Finland